This is a list of notable Māori composers.

 Wiremu Nia Nia Totara Tree 
 Karl Teariki
 Whirimako Black
 Dean Hapeta
 Turuhira Hare
 Fanny Rose Howie "Princess Te Rangi Pai", of Hine E Hine fame
 Kingi Matutaera Ihaka
 Maewa Kaihau
 Derek Lardelli
 Dr Hirini Melbourne
 Hinewehi Mohi
 Sir Āpirana Ngata
 Tuini Moetu Haangu Ngawai
 Tuta Nihoniho
 Ngoi Pewhairangi
 Kohine Ponika 
 Richard Puanaki
 Rua Kenana
 Ruia Aperahama
 Hohepa Tamehana
 Prince Tui Teka
 Te Kooti Arikirangi
 Inia Te Wiata
 Mahinaarangi Tocker
 Ngapo Wehi
 Dr Pimia Wehi

References

Māori culture
Māori music
 
Māori-related lists